The 1999 Family Circle Cup was a WTA tennis tournament, played on outdoor clay courts.

Players

Seeds

Qualifiers

Lucky loser
  Larisa Neiland

Qualifying draw

First qualifier

Second qualifier

Third qualifier

Fourth qualifier

Fifth qualifier

Sixth qualifier

Seventh qualifier

Eighth qualifier

References
 1999 Family Circle Cup Qualifying Draw

Charleston Open
Family Circle Cup